Njuskalo.hr is a Croatian classified ads website. It is part of the Styria Media Group and is among top 10 visited websites in Croatia. As of 2018, Njuškalo.hr had 1,4 million users who were selling 250,000 items per month, making it the biggest Croatian classified ads website.

References

Online marketplaces of Croatia
Internet properties established in 2007
2007 establishments in Croatia